RNAS Hatston, also called HMS Sparrowhawk, was a Royal Naval Air Station, one mile to the north west of Kirkwall on the island of Mainland, Orkney, Scotland.  It was located near the strategically vital naval base of Scapa Flow, which for most of the twentieth century formed the main base of the ships of the Home Fleet.

History

Hatston's main period of activity came during the Second World War, when it was host to a number of different types of aircraft of the Fleet Air Arm, including Fairey Swordfish, Blackburn Rocs, Grumman Martlet IV and Grumman Avengers.  Two squadrons of Blackburn Skuas flew from Hatston on 10 April 1940, on a mission to sink the German cruiser Königsberg, in which they were successful.

After the end of the war, the airfield became the island's main airport, until 1948.  By then British European Airways was operating Douglas Dakotas which were deemed too large to use the runways safely.  They moved operations to a larger airfield, RAF Grimsetter, outside Kirkwall. RNAS Hatston remained in use from 1953 until 1957, when it was the home of the Orkney Flying Club, but was finally closed and turned into an industrial estate.

Units
The following units were here at some point:
 700 NAS, 701 NAS, 712 NAS, 746 NAS, 771 NAS
 800 NAS, 801 NAS, 802 NAS, 803 NAS, 804 NAS, 806 NAS, 807 NAS, 809 NAS, 
 810 NAS, 811 NAS, 812 NAS,  813 NAS, 814 NAS, 816 NAS, 817 NAS, 818 NAS, 819 NAS,
 820 NAS, 821 NAS, 822 NAS, 823 NAS, 824 NAS, 825 NAS, 826 NAS, 827 NAS, 828 NAS, 829 NAS, 
 830 NAS, 831 NAS, 832 NAS, 833 NAS, 835 NAS, 836M Flight, 837 NAS, 837D Flight,
 840 NAS, 841 NAS, 842 NAS, 845 NAS, 846 NAS, 848 NAS, 852 NAS, 853 NAS, 856 NAS, 
 860 NAS, 878 NAS, 880 NAS, 881 NAS, 882 NAS, 883 NAS, 884 NAS, 885 NAS, 887 NAS, 888 NAS, 
 890 NAS, 891 NAS, 893 NAS, 894 NAS, 896 NAS, 898 NAS, 899 NAS,
 1770 NAS, 1771 NAS,
 1820 NAS, 1840 NAS, 1841 NAS, 1842 NAS,
 No. 254 Squadron RAF

References

Citations

Bibliography

External links

History of RNAS Hatston

Royal Naval Air Stations in Scotland
Buildings and structures in Orkney
Aviation in Scotland
Royal Navy bases in Scotland
Kirkwall